Josh Hammond (born July 24, 1998) is an American football wide receiver for the DC Defenders of the XFL. He played college football at Florida.

College career
Hammond was a member of the Florida Gators for four seasons. He finished his collegiate career with 87 receptions for 1,138 yards and six touchdowns and 134 yards and two touchdowns rushing in 49 games played.

Professional career

Jacksonville Jaguars
Hammond signed with the Jacksonville Jaguars as an undrafted free agent on April 25, 2020. He was waived on September 6, 2021, during final roster cuts and was re-signed to the practice squad the next day. Hammond remained on the practice squad for the 2020 season and signed a reserve/future contract with the Jaguars on January 4, 2021. He was cut by the Jaguars at the end of training camp on August 31, 2021, and was re-signed back to the team's practice squad. Hammond was elevated to the active roster on December 26, 2021, for the team's Week 16 game against the New York Jets and made his NFL debut in the game. He signed a reserve/future contract on January 10, 2022. He was waived on May 16, 2022.

Philadelphia Eagles
On May 17, Hammond was claimed off waivers by the Philadelphia Eagles. He was waived on July 26, 2022.

New England Patriots
On July 28, 2022, Hammond signed with the New England Patriots. He was released on August 30, 2022.

DC Defenders 
On November 17, 2022, Hammond was drafted by the DC Defenders of the XFL.

Personal life
Hammond is the younger brother of former Florida and NFL wide receiver Frankie Hammond.

References

External links
Florida Gators bio
Jacksonville Jaguars bio

1998 births
Living people
People from Hallandale Beach, Florida
Sportspeople from Broward County, Florida
Players of American football from Florida
American football wide receivers
Florida Gators football players
Jacksonville Jaguars players
Philadelphia Eagles players
New England Patriots players
DC Defenders players